Luke Cheevers is a traditional Irish singer from Ringsend, Dublin, now living in the north side of the city. He is a member of An Goilin Singers Club in Dublin which was founded by Tim Dennehy and Donal De Barra in 1980. Cheevers is known for his distinctive Dublin repertoire and style.

See also
Traditional Irish Singers
List of people from Dublin

References 

Living people
Irish folk singers
Irish male singers
Musicians from County Dublin
1940 births